Paul Henrion, (20 July 1819 – 24 October 1901 ) was a 19th-century French composer.

In a panorama of the world of songs published in 1882 in Le Figaro, the journalist considered him "a first-rate artist whose romances for salons were famous". Henrion sometimes signed his compositions under the pseudonym Henri Charlemagne.

References 

French composers
Musicians from Paris
1819 births
1901 deaths